Antoine Marie Garin (23 July 1810 – 14 April 1889) was a French Roman Catholic priest, missionary and educationalist who came to New Zealand. He was born in Rambert-en-Bugey, France on 23 July 1810. He ministered in Auckland, Northland and, most notable, in Nelson, New Zealand.

He died in 1889 and was buried at Wakapuaka Cemetery in Nelson.

Memorials 
A secondary school, Garin College in Nelson, New Zealand, is named after Antoine Marie Garin. Nelson has a region called Garindale on the way into the city from Blenheim, a Garin Heights at Atawhai, a Garin Grove and an Antoine Grove in Richmond. There is a Garin Way in Mt Wellington, Auckland, and an Espace Antoine Garin in his home town of Saint-Rambert-en-Bugey, Ain, France.

References

1810 births
1889 deaths
New Zealand educators
French Roman Catholic missionaries
19th-century New Zealand Roman Catholic priests
French emigrants to New Zealand
Burials at Wakapuaka Cemetery
Roman Catholic missionaries in New Zealand
19th-century French Roman Catholic priests